is a Japanese footballer who plays for Fujieda MYFC.

Career
Akiyama began in Kansai University from 2011 to 2014 as youth team. In 2015, He signed to J3 club, Gainare Tottori after graduation from college. In 2017, He left for tottori after 2 years at club. In 2018, He signed to J3 club, Fujieda MYFC. On 20 November 2022, he brought his club promotion to J2 league for the first time in history.

Career statistics
.

References

External links

Profile at Gainare Tottori

1992 births
Living people
Kansai University alumni
Association football people from Kagawa Prefecture
Japanese footballers
J3 League players
Gainare Tottori players
Association football defenders